Evenwood is an unincorporated community in Randolph County, West Virginia, United States.

The community was named after Evenwood, in England, the ancestral home of a local lumber dealer.

References 

Unincorporated communities in West Virginia
Unincorporated communities in Randolph County, West Virginia